Forojs was a fortnightly Yiddish-language arts and literature magazine published by the General Jewish Labour Bund from Warsaw, Poland.

References

General Jewish Labour Bund in Poland
Defunct literary magazines published in Poland
Jews and Judaism in Warsaw
Magazines with year of disestablishment missing
Magazines with year of establishment missing
Magazines published in Warsaw
Visual arts magazines published in Poland
Yiddish-language mass media in Poland
Yiddish periodicals